The Troy Public Square is a historic district in Troy, Ohio, United States that is listed on the National Register of Historic Places. The "downtown area," the junction of Main and Market Streets, is a commerce center for Troy because of its central location in the town, restaurants and stores which line the square. Troy Main Street also hosts events in the Public Square frequently as a way to help grow businesses in the downtown area.

References

Historic districts on the National Register of Historic Places in Ohio